Anti-Judaism in Early Christianity is a description of anti-Judaic sentiment in the first three centuries of Christianity; the 1st, 2nd, and 3rd centuries. Early Christianity is sometimes considered as Christianity before 325 when the First Council of Nicaea was convoked by Constantine the Great, although it is not unusual to consider 4th and 5th century Christianity as members of this category as well.

Jewish Christians were excluded from the synagogue, according to one theory of the Council of Jamnia, as they refused to pay the Fiscus Judaicus.

William Nicholls wrote in his book Christian Antisemitism: A History of Hate:

Rabbi Michael J. Cook believes that both contemporary Jews and contemporary Christians need to reexamine the history of early Christianity, and the transformation of Christianity from a Jewish sect consisting of followers of a Jewish Jesus, to a separate religion often dependent on the tolerance of Rome while proselytizing among Gentiles loyal to the Roman empire, to understand how the story of Jesus came to be recast in an anti-Jewish form as the Gospels took their final form.

The Greek word Ioudaioi could also be translated "Judaeans", meaning in some cases specifically the Jews from Judaea, as opposed to people from Galilee or Samaria for instance.

New Testament

It has been argued that the New Testament contributed toward subsequent antisemitism in the Christian community. A. Roy Eckardt has asserted that the foundation of antisemitism and responsibility for the Holocaust lies ultimately in the New Testament.

Eckardt insisted that Christian repentance must include a reexamination of basic theological attitudes toward Jews and the New Testament in order to deal effectively with antisemitism.

Post New Testament 
A number of hostile early actions taken by Church leaders against the Jews are believed to have influenced later Christian thought. 

One example of these acts comes from a historical account relating to Ambrose, the bishop of Milan. In 388, then-Roman Emperor Theodosius the Great was informed that a bishop in Callinicum led his followers in the destruction and burning of a local synagogue. Ambrose, upon learning of the local governor of Callinicum's intent to force the bishop responsible to pay for the reconstruction of the synagogue, appealed the sentence to the Emperor. When Theodosius first denied the appeal, Ambrose "publicly refused him communion until he reversed the governor's sentence." Ultimately, Theodosius agreed with Ambrose and the decision of the governor was overturned. Many scholars believe that instances like this contributed to Christian notions of the Jews as second-class citizens, whose property is worth inherently less than theirs.

According to the 3rd century Roman historian Justin, the Christians were "seen as the 'true spiritual Israel' because the Jews had despised and forsaken the law of God and God's holy covenant". Many Roman officials, including Justin, based upon the perception of the Christians as their god's chosen people, advocated for the expansion of Gentile rights in the Roman Empire, while also aiming to drastically reduce the rights the Jews had during that time, believing their claim to legitimacy to be false.

See also 

 Christian antisemitism
 Deicide
 Good Friday Prayer
 History of antisemitism
 Jews in the New Testament
 Judaism
 Judas Iscariot
 Passion of the Christ
 Persecution of Christians
 Pre-Adamite
 Religious pluralism
 Criticisms of Christianity

References

Further reading
 "Christian Antisemitism: A History of Hate" by William Nicholls, 1993. Published by Jason Aronson Inc., 1995.
 "Persécutions, calomnies, ‘birkat ha-Minim’, et émissaires juifs de propagande antichrétienne dans le Dialogue avec Tryphon de Justin Martyr" by Philippe Bobichon, Revue des Études Juives 162 /3-4, 2003, pp. 403-419 online
 "Le thème du ‘verus Israel’ est-il constitutif de la controverse entre judaïsme et christianisme (débuts du christianisme - fin du Moyen âge) ? by Philippe Bobichon, Annali di Storia dell’Esegesi 22/2 (2005), pp. 423-446 online
 "Littérature de controverse entre judaïsme et christianisme : Description du corpus et réflexions méthodologiques (IIe-XVIe siècle). Textes grecs, latins et hébreux) by Philippe Bobichon, Revue d’Histoire ecclésiastique 107/1, 2012, pp. 5-48 online
 "Is Violence intrinsic to Religious Confrontation? The Case of Judeo-Christian Controversy, Second to Seventeenth century » by Philippe Bobichon. In Sudhir Chandra (dir.): Violence and Non-violence across Times. History, Religion and Culture, Routledge, London/New York, 2018, pp. 33-52 online
 "Mature Christianity: The Recognition and Repudiation of the Anti-Jewish Polemic in the New Testament" Norman A. Beck, Susquehanna Univ. Press, 1985
 "The Satanizing of the Jews: Origin and development of mystical anti-Semitism" Joel Carmichael, Fromm, 1993
 "The Origins of Anti-Semitism: Attitudes Toward Judaism in Pagan and Christian Antiquity" John G. Gager, Oxford Univ. Press, 1983
 "What Did They Think of the Jews?" Edited by Allan Gould, Jason Aronson Inc., 1991
 "The New Testament's Anti-Jewish Slander and Conventions of Ancient Polemic", Luke Johnson, Journal of Biblical Literature, Volume 3, 1989
 "Three Popes and the Jews" Pinchas E. Lapide, Hawthorne Books, 1967
 "National Socialism and the Roman Catholic Church" Nathaniel Micklem, Oxford Univ. Press, 1939
 Theological Anti-Semitism in the New Testament", Rosemary Radford Ruether, Christian Century, Feb. 1968, Vol. 85
 "John Chrysostom and the Jews" Robert L. Wilken, Univ. of California Press, Berkeley, 1983
 "Anti-Semitism in the Church?" by Julio Dam

External links
 Tikva Frymer-Kensky, David Novak, Peter Ochs, Michael Signer, Dabru Emet - A Jewish Statement On Christians And Christianity, The Institute for Christian & Jewish Studies (archived) 

 Southern Baptist Prayer Guides: The Southern Baptist concept of salvation, How Christians view non-Christian religions, Current attempts to convert Jews to Christianity, The relationships between Christianity and other religions, including Judaism, A brief history of 2000 years of Jewish Persecution. Religioustolerance.com

Ancient Christian antisemitism